Chris Mansell (born 1953) is an Australian poet and publisher.

Born in Sydney, Chris Mansell grew up on the Central Coast of New South Wales and in Lae, Papua New Guinea, later studying economics at the University of Sydney. She was active in Sydney in the 1970s and 1980s as an editor and poet and since the 1980s has lived on the south coast of NSW, Australia where she continues to write, perform, publish and edit. In 1978 she and Dane Thwaites began a magazine called Compass Poetry & Prose which published many of the young Australian poets of the time. She closed the magazine in 1987 and soon after, was a member of the collective (which included David Reiter among others) who founded Five Islands Press. She now runs PressPress, a small independent poetry press she founded in 2002.

Like many poets of her generation, Mansell has made her living by performing her work, publishing and teaching writing at various institutions. Primarily a poet, she has also written a number of plays including Some Sunny Day. Her collection Mortifications & Lies has been described as a 'groundbreaking work' because of its experimentation with form and its overtly political content. Love Poems is less political, a livre composé which takes subtler formal risks. Spine Lingo: new and selected poems appeared with Kardoorair in 2011. Always interested in experimentation with form, she now also works in digital media and artist editions which are experimental in physical form as well as content. On this front, her newest works (Stung and Stung More) comprise poems in the 'quad' form which combines strict restrictions with uninhibited content. The quads definitive collection is in 101 Quads. She directed the Shoalhaven Poetry Festival in 2002, 2003 and 2005.

She was winner of the Queensland Premier's Literary Award (poetry) and has been shortlisted for the NSW Premier's Literature Award, and the Banjo Award (Victoria). She won the Meanjin Dorothy Porter Poetry Prize in 2014.

Works 
Poetry
 Head, Heart & Stone (Fling Publishers, Melbourne, 1982)
 Redshift/Blueshift (Five Islands Press, Wollongong, 1988)
 Raptors Blue (Audio, with music by Rob Cousins) (Well Sprung Productions, Sydney, 1989)
 Shining Like a Jinx (Amelia, California, USA, 1992)
 Day Easy Sunlight Fine in Hot Collation (Penguin, Melbourne, 1995) 
 Stalking the Rainbow (PressPress, 2002)
 Fickle Brat (IP Digital, Brisbane, 2002)
 Mortifications & Lies (Kardoorair Press, Armidale, 2005) 
 Love poems (Kardoorair Press, Armidale, 2006) 
 Letters (Kardoorair Press, Armidale, 2009)
 The view from a beach (PressPress, 2010) 
 Spine Lingo: new and selected poems (Kardoorair Press, Armidale, 2011) 
 Love Cuts with Richard Tipping (Well Sprung Productions, 2013) 
 Seven Stations(Well Sprung Productions, 2013)  and as CD with Andrew Batt-Rawden (composer)(Hospital Hill, 2013)
 101 Quads (Puncher & Wattmann/Thorny Devil Press, 2020) 
 artist books including Aves, the quiet book, Stung and Stung More.

Fiction
 Schadenvale Road (Interactive Press, Brisbane, 2011) 

Children's book
 Little Wombat (New Holland, Sydney, 1996)

References

External links 
 Home page
 4 poems at Australian Literature Resources
 blip.tv Samples of experimental digital work
 Interview from Famous Reporter
  Mansell's publisher site, PressPress
 Review of Fickle Brat
 Review of Mortifications & Lies
 Review of Love Poems
 Review of Letters in Stylus
 Review of Letters in Cordite
 Review of Spine Lingo
 Review of Schadenvale Road
 Review of Stung in Cordite

1953 births
20th-century Australian dramatists and playwrights
20th-century Australian poets
Australian women short story writers
Living people
Writers from New South Wales
Australian publishers (people)
Australian women poets
Australian women dramatists and playwrights
21st-century Australian dramatists and playwrights
21st-century Australian poets
21st-century Australian women writers
20th-century Australian women writers